A'keria Chanel Davenport (born March 1, 1988) is the stage name of Gregory D'Wayne, an American drag queen best known for competing on the eleventh season of RuPaul's Drag Race (2019) and the sixth season of RuPaul's Drag Race All Stars (2021). 
As a professional entertainer, she has won several national titles in drag pageantry systems, including Miss Black Universe in 2017. Davenport was recognized by Dallas Voice as a Texan of the Year in 2019.

Career

2011–2018: Drag beginnings 

Davenport started participating in drag pageants since 2011. Some of her titles include Miss Unity of America Newcomer 2011, Miss Wessland Newcomer 2012, Miss Diamond of the South Newcomer 2012, Miss International Vogue 2017, and Miss Black Universe 2017.

2019–present: RuPaul's Drag Race 
A'keria was announced to be one of fifteen contestants competing on season eleven of RuPaul's Drag Race on January 24, 2019. In episode three, she was involved in the show's first ever six-way lip sync with Honey Davenport, Ra'Jah O'Hara, Plastique Tiara, Scarlet Envy, and Shuga Cain, which she survived. She later lip synced again with Ra'Jah to Sheena Easton's "Strut" in episode seven. She won two main challenges, in episodes six and nine. She placed 3rd/4th alongside Silky Nutmeg Ganache after losing a lip sync against Yvie Oddly, who would eventually win the season against Brooke Lynn Hytes.

From March 26 to September 6, she was a part of the rotating cast for RuPaul's Drag Race: Season 11 Tour, presented by Voss Events and World of Wonder, and hosted by Asia O'Hara. The show kicked off in Los Angeles on May 26 during the RuPaul's DragCon LA wrap party (hosted by Drag Race judge Michelle Visage) and concluded with a final bow on September 6 in New York City (also hosted by Visage) at the top of RuPaul’s DragCon NYC.

A'keria was in a music video for Lizzo's "Juice" on April 17, 2019. She portrayed Nicki Minaj in the music video for Taylor Swift's "You Need to Calm Down" on June 17, 2019. On August 26, 2019, Davenport performed alongside Taylor Swift during her 2019 MTV Video Music Awards performance.

In April 2020, amid the coronavirus pandemic, Davenport was announced as a featured cast member for the very first Digital Drag Fest, an online drag festival for all ages, with attendees given opportunities to interact with the artists, tip them, and win prizes during the broadcast.

On May 26, 2021, it was revealed that A'keria would be competing in RuPaul's Drag Race All Stars Season 6 along with 12 other contestants, including fellow Season 11 contestants Ra'Jah O'Hara, Scarlet Envy, and Silky Nutmeg Ganache. After landing in the bottom on episodes 3 and 4, she was later sent home by Kylie Sonique Love on the 6th episode “Rumerican Horror Story: Coven Girls” (a parody of American Horror Story) after placing in the bottom with fellow season 11 contestant Ra’Jah O’Hara.

In August 2021, they were a featured performer and host in Klub Kids London Presents: NOIR: The Tour, where 25% of the proceeds from the production were donated to the Black Lives Matter movement.

Personal life 
A'keria C. Davenport is a member of the Drag Haus of Davenport, with Drag Race alum Kennedy Davenport, Sahara Davenport, Monét X Change, Honey Davenport and Ra'Jah O'Hara. Her drag mom is Armani Nicole Davenport. D'Wayne was living in Dallas before being accepted on Drag Race. After Drag Race, D'Wayne moved to Katy. 
He has stated that he plans to create a skincare line as well as start a charity that will provide support for transgender women and homosexual youth.

D'Wayne spent almost a year of his life as a woman, Kiki, until he realized he identified as a man. He opened up about this experience on the fifth episode of the sixth season of RuPaul's Drag Race All Stars, saying: "It took me to go through that experience to not only find myself but to know who I truly was and wanted to be to know I was enough... I faced the same obstacles most trans people ([especially] those of color) and that's why I will now and forever advocate and dedicate everything in me to protect them!"

Filmography

Television

Music videos

Web series

Discography

Featured singles

Awards and nominations

References

External links 

Living people
African-American drag queens
Entertainers from Dallas
Entertainers from Houston
A'keria Davenport
American drag queens
A'keria Davenport
People who detransitioned
Gay entertainers
LGBT people from Texas
1988 births